Tolypocladium is a genus of fungi within the family Ophiocordycipitaceae. It includes species that are parasites of other fungi, insect pathogens, rotifer pathogens and soil inhabiting species with uncertain ecological roles. Tolypocladium was originally circumscribed as a genus containing anamorphic fungi. It was later determined that some Cordyceps-like teleomorphic fungi were the teleomorphs of Tolypocladium species. These species were considered to belong in the genus Cordyceps until molecular phylogenetics studies found these species to be more closely related to Ophiocordyceps and were considered to belong in that genus before they were transferred to the new genus Elaphocordyceps by Sung and colleagues in 2007. However, under the ICN's 2011 "one fungus, one name" principle, fungi can not have different names for their anamorphic and teleomorphic stages if they are found to be the same taxon. Quandt and colleagues formally synonymized Tolypocladium and Elaphocordyceps in 2014. Quandt and colleagues also synonymized the anamorphic genus Chaunopycnis with Tolypocladium. The immunosuppressant drug ciclosporin was originally isolated from Tolypocladium inflatum, and has since been found in other species of Tolypocladium, some of which were formerly placed in Chaunopycnis.

Species
Tolypocladium album
Tolypocladium capitatum
Tolypocladium cylindrosporum
Tolypocladium delicatistipitatum
Tolypocladium extinguens
Tolypocladium fractum
Tolypocladium geodes
Tolypocladium inegoense
Tolypocladium inflatum (alsoTolypocladium niveum)
Tolypocladium intermedium
Tolypocladium japonicum
Tolypocladium jezoense
Tolypocladium lignicola
Tolypocladium longicolleum
Tolypocladium longisegmentum
Tolypocladium minazukiense
Tolypocladium miomoteanum
Tolypocladium nubicola
Tolypocladium ophioglossoides
Tolypocladium ovalisporum
Tolypocladium paradoxum
Tolypocladium pustulatum
Tolypocladium ramosum
Tolypocladium rouxii
Tolypocladium sinense
Tolypocladium szemaoense
Tolypocladium tenuisporum
Tolypocladium terricola
Tolypocladium toriharamontanum
Tolypocladium trigonosporum
Tolypocladium tundrense
Tolypocladium valliforme
Tolypocladium valvatistipitatum

References

Hypocreales genera
Ophiocordycipitaceae
Taxa described in 1971